Lentswe Community Radio is a South African community radio station based in the Free State province of South Africa.

Coverage areas 
Based in Parys, it covers most of Ngwathe (Fezile Dabi District Municipality) in the Free State.
Also reaches most of the southern part of Gauteng and a small section of the eastern part of the North West.
Includes Brits, Potchefstroom, Kroonstad, Sasolburg, Johannesburg and Soweto.

Broadcast languages
English
SeSotho

Broadcast time
24/7

Target audience
General public and working community
LSM groups 1-8
Age group 16–50+

Programme format
60% talk
40% music

Listenership figures

References

External links
 SAARF Website

Community radio stations in South Africa
Fezile Dabi District Municipality
Mass media in the Free State (province)